Alma Stephanie Wittlin, Alma S. Wittlin, (March 23, 1899 Lemberg – December 31, 1992 Palo Alto) was an Austrian writer. Her surname also appears as Wittlin-Frischauer.

Life 
Born in or near Lviv, Austro-Hungarian Empire, she was educated in Vienna, receiving a doctorate in art history from the University of Vienna in 1925, and came to England in 1937. She carried out educational research at the Museum of Archaeology and Anthropology, University of Cambridge. In 1952, she came to the United States and was naturalized in 1959.

In 1921, she married Paul Max Frischauer.

While in Austria, she wrote a number of successful historical novels.

Wittlin called for museums to take their role as educational institutions more seriously.

She died in Palo Alto, California.

An annual lecture given in her honour is sponsored by the International Council of Museums.

Selected works 
 The Museum. Its history and its tasks in education (1949)
 Museums. In search of a usable future (1970)

Further reading
 Hadwig Kraeutler: Exil ohne Ende? Briefe einer Rastlosen. Alma S. Wittlins Briefwechsel in (inter)nationalen Netzwerken, in Irene Below, Inge Hansen-Schaberg, Maria Kublitz-Kramer (Hgg.): Das Ende des Exils? Briefe von Frauen nach 1945. Reihe: Frauen und Exil, 7. edition text + kritik, Munich 2015: 170–185.
 : Alma S. Wittlin (1899–1992). In bester Gesellschaft und, Self-made‘, In: Ursula Seeber, Veronika Zwerger und Claus-Dieter Krohn, Kometen des Geldes. Exil und Ökonomie, Exilforschung, 33, Munich 2015: 228–245.
 : Wittlin Alma S., in Ilse Korotin (ed.) biografiA, Lexikon österreichischer Frauen, Band 3, Böhlau, Wien 2016: 3573–3575. (Lexikoneintrag)
 : Alma S. Wittlin: Beobachtungen zu Kriegs- und Friedensreflexionen. In: "Zwischenwelt", Periodical of the Theodor Kramer-Society Vienna, Autumn (October) 2016   (in German)
 Hadwig Kraeutler: Alma S. Wittlin. Preliminary remarks on the life and scholarship of an austrian émigré, 2013
 Hadwig Kräutler: The Museologist, Writer, Educationalist Alma S. Wittlin (1899 - 1990). A Preliminary Research Report. Smithsonian Institution, 2011

References 

1899 births
1992 deaths
Austrian women historians
20th-century Austrian women writers
Austrian historical novelists
Austrian Jews
20th-century Austrian writers
20th-century Austrian historians
Austrian emigrants to the United Kingdom